Gerald Forbes McKellar (2 March 1884 – 16 January 1960) was a New Zealand rugby union player. He was a member of the New Zealand national side, the All Blacks, on their 1910 tour of Australia, playing in five matches, including all three internationals.

McKellar died at Dunedin on 16 January 1960, and his ashes were buried at Andersons Bay Cemetery.

References

1884 births
1960 deaths
People educated at Otago Boys' High School
New Zealand rugby union players
New Zealand international rugby union players
Hawke's Bay rugby union players
Wellington rugby union players
Otago rugby union players
Rugby union wings
Rugby union flankers
Burials at Andersons Bay Cemetery
Rugby union players from Canterbury, New Zealand